Retkovci  is a village in Croatia.

Name
The name of the village in Croatian is plural.

Populated places in Vukovar-Syrmia County